Woombah is a small but growing bushland village in Clarence Valley, New South Wales, Australia. This hamlet is located to the south of the World Heritage-listed Bundjalung National Park, near the Port of Yamba on Goodwood Island, and 15 minutes from the fishing village of Iluka, New South Wales.

History

There is a significant Aboriginal site at Woombah, one of five in the Lower Clarence area. The north arm of the Clarence River at Woombah forms the border between the Bundjalung tribe to the north and the Yaegl peoples to the south.

The first Europeans settled in Woombah in 1830, establishing a timber industry.

Name

An Aboriginal name for the star Canopus is womba, meaning the "Mad Star". However this is a word from the Euahlayi people located in north-central New South Wales and south-central Queensland, and whilst unsure of its origin there is a general acceptance that Woombah means 'crazy star'.

Geography

Caravan Parks
There are several caravan parks located in Woombah:
 Woombah Woods Caravan Park
 Bimbimbi Riverside Caravan Park
 Browns Rocks Caravan Park

Attractions 

Woombah is located on the North Arm of the popular fishing Clarence River. The North Arm of the Clarence River includes flathead, whiting, bream and mud crabs.

Local attractions in Woombah also include a coffee plantation which is home to one of the world's southern-most coffee plantations, "Woombah Coffee Plantation". 

Other attractions include an old schoolhouse and a number of artist studio galleries.

Woombah is also located adjacent to Bundjalung National Park. 

Activities include beach walking, fishing, mountain biking and camping.

Demographics

2016 Estimated Population Data by Gender/Age 
50.5% Male
49.5% Female
59.0 Median Age
10.7% Population 0–14 Years
31.9% Population Over 65

2016 Registered Marital Status 
Married 51.1%
Separated 5.9%
Divorced 12.4%
Widowed 6.3%
Never Married 24.4%

2016 Religious Affiliation  
No Religion 28.9%
Anglican 23.7%
Not Stated 13.6%
Catholic 15.9%
Uniting Church 6.9%

2016 Languages Spoken at Home  
English 87.9% 
Greek 0.7%
Dutch 0.5%
Tagalog 0.4%
Romanian 0.4%

Transportation

Buses run through Woombah with bus stops located along Iluka Road. The nearest airport is Clarence Valley Regional Airport (YGFN) in Grafton offering daily flights to Sydney.

Newspapers

The Clarence Valley Independent

Weather
The climate is warm and temperate in Woombah. Woombah has a significant amount of rainfall during the year. This is true even for the driest month. According to the Köppen climate classification, this climate is classified as Cfa which is a humid subtropical climate.

References

Northern Rivers
1830 establishments in Australia
Clarence Valley Council